Uncial 057 (in the Gregory-Aland numbering), is a Greek uncial manuscript of the New Testament, dated palaeographically to the 4th or 5th century.

Description 
The codex contains a part of the Acts of Apostles (3:5-6,10-12), on a fragment of only one leaf (9 cm by 13 cm). The text is written in two columns per page, 27 lines per page. The letters are small, about 2 mm high. C. R. Gregory added it to the list of New Testament manuscripts in 1908.

The Greek text of this codex is a good representative of the Alexandrian text-type. Kurt Aland placed it in Category I.

Currently it is dated by the INTF to the 4th or 5th century.

The codex now is located at the Berlin State Museums (P. 9808), in Berlin.

See also 
 List of New Testament uncials
 Textual criticism

References

Further reading 

 A. H. Salonius, Die griechischen Handschriftenfragmente des Neuen Testaments in den Staatlichen Museen zu Berlin, ZNW 26 (1927), pp. 97-119. 

4th-century biblical manuscripts
Greek New Testament uncials